Edward or Ed Morrison may refer to:

Sportspeople
 Edward Morrison (American football) (1894–1961), American college football coach
 Edward Morrison (boxer) in New Zealand at the 1958 British Empire and Commonwealth Games
 Ed Morrison (rugby union) (Edward Francis Morrison), English rugby union referee
 Eddie Morrison, Scottish footballer and manager

Others
 Edward Morrison (British Army officer), governor of Chester, 1795–1844
 Edward Morrison (politician), lieutenant-governor of Jamaica, 1811–1813
 Edward Whipple Bancroft Morrison (1867–1925), Canadian journalist and general
 Eddy Morrison, right wing British activist
 Edward Morrison, owner of Edward Morrison House
 Edward Morrison, character in Mr. Skeffington
 Ed Morrison (Hollyoaks), Hollyoaks character